Neoclinus toshimaensis is a species of chaenopsid blenny found in rocky reefs around Japan, in the northwest Pacific ocean. It can reach a maximum length of  TL. This species feeds primarily on benthic algae and weeds.

References

Further reading
 Fukao, R., 1980 (Feb.) Review of Japanese fishes of the genus Neoclinus with description of two new species and notes on habitat preference. Publications of Seto Marine Biological Laboratory v. 25 (no. 1/4): 175–209, Pls. 1–2.

toshimaensis
Fish described in 1980